Tengizbay is a mountain pass at the border of Batken Region and Osh Region of Kyrgyzstan. It connects the village Daroot-Korgon in the Alay Valley with the city Kyzyl-Kiya in the Fergana Valley.

References

External links 
Satellite map at Maplandia.com

Batken Region
Osh Region
Mountain passes of Kyrgyzstan